The Bronco Wine Company is a vintner that produces wines under many brands and is based in Ceres, California.  It is the fourth largest producer of wine in the United States. Bronco Wine Co has 10000 employees at all locations globally. (Employees figure is modelled). There are 2 companies in the Bronco Wine Co corporate family.

Fred and Joe Franzia attended Santa Clara University and picked their school symbol for the company. Bronco is a contraction of Brothers and Cousin, after the three founders.

History
CEO Fred Franzia – nephew of wine legend Ernest Gallo – started Bronco Wine in 1973 with his brother Joseph and his cousin, John Franzia, after the Franzia winery business was purchased by Coca-Cola. The Franzia brand was later purchased by the Wine Group, a privately-held bulk wine producer based in San Francisco (the source of the "bag-in-box" wines that bear the Franzia name, but which have no connection to either the Franzia family or to Bronco).

In 1995 Bronco Wine Company purchased the brandname Charles Shaw from a bankrupt company and used it for a line of very inexpensive wines, introduced in 2002 and priced at $1.99 per bottle. The wines became nicknamed "Two-Buck Chuck" and were sold exclusively through Trader Joe's stores.

In August 2013, Bronco Wine Company entered into a marketing campaign for its Allure Moscato wine products in partnership with Hip Hop artist Warren G and Brand Elite, LLC.

Activities

Description

Bronco owns over 35,000 acres (140 km) of vineyards, most of which are located in California's Central Valley, with storage and production facilities in Ceres, Napa Valley, Sonoma Valley, Escalon and Madera. The wine producer has the capacity to produce 61 million gallons (230 million L) of wine annually. Total annual sales are approximately 20 million cases.

Franzia's marketing methods contrast with those of his higher priced competitors, although he is also credited with introducing new consumers to the wine market and ultimately to the premium brands. Franzia himself has said in reference to claims that he sells wine for virtually the same price as a bottle of water: "They're overcharging for the water. Don't you get it?" and "I don't make wine to put in a closet. We sell wine to drink."

Bronco Wine is best known for its Charles Shaw wine brand of varietals, which for over ten years were commonly nicknamed "Two Buck Chuck" because of the retail price of $1.99 a bottle at Trader Joe's stores in California and some other states. "We choose to sell good quality wines at $2 a bottle because we think it's a fair price," Fred Franzia told ABC News. "We think the other people are charging too much." The Charles Shaw Chardonnay wine won the double gold at the 2007 California State Fair Commercial Wine Competition.

Brands
The Bronco Wine Company maintains over 250 brands of wine, including:

Controversies
In 1993 Franzia and Bronco Wine Company were indicted on federal charges of conspiracy to defraud by misrepresenting cheaper grapes as premium Zinfandel and Cabernet Sauvignon.  Bronco pleaded no contest and paid a $2.5 million fine.  Franzia also pleaded guilty for his involvement, paid a $500,000 fine, stepped down as Bronco's president and member of the company's board of directors and agreed to refrain from having any involvement with grape purchasing for five years in lieu of prison time.

Franzia has also been at odds with California's premium winemakers for several years over his inclusion of Napa and other related appellation terms on labels of his wines. Franzia sued the state of California over implementation of a 2000 law that tightened federal labeling laws. His lawsuit was unsuccessful initially and up through the appeals process as well; he eventually sought certiorari in the United States Supreme Court, but the Court declined to take the case.

References

External links 

Company information from Hoover's Online.
Fred Franzia Warms at 30th Anniversary of Bronco Wine Company by Paul Franson from Wine Business Monthly in June 2004.
http://www.sfgate.com/cgi-bin/article.cgi?f=/c/a/2006/05/18/WIGG0ISRON1.DTL Article from San Francisco Chronicle regarding labeling lawsuit
http://www.inc.com/magazine/20060501/franzia.html Article from Inc. magazine about Fred Franzia
How a $2 bottle changed wine industry article from msnbc.com

Wineries in California
California wine
Ceres, California
Companies based in Stanislaus County, California
Food and drink companies established in 1973
1973 establishments in California